International Lethwei Federation Japan, also known as ILFJ, is a Japanese Lethwei promotion company with headquarters in Tokyo.

History 
In 2016, the ILFJ acquired a ‘’Grade-A’’ promoter licence from the Myanmar Traditional Lethwei Federation, allowing them to organize traditional Lethwei events in Japan. ILFJ then entered into a partnership with Myanmar businessman Mr. Wunna CEO of Myanmar Media Group (MMG), the organizer of the Myanmar Lethwei World Championship, to share fighters and co-organize the Lethwei events in Japan. The first ILFJ event titled Lethwei Grand Prix in Japan 2016, was held on 27 October 2016 at Korakuen Hall in Tokyo, Japan.

On April 18, 2017, the Ambassador of Myanmar to Japan attended the first ever Lethwei world title fight headlining two non-Burmese in the sport's history at Lethwei in Japan 3. The event organized by ILFJ featured reigning champion Dave Leduc vs Adem Yilmaz inside the Korakuen Hall in Tokyo.

On July 10, 2022, hosted a 10 fights Lethwei tournament named Lethwei Unbeatable in Oyabe, Japan.

Media coverage 
After having an inaugural first event in the Japan in Tokyo (Lethwei Grand Prix 2016), FITE TV signed a multi-year agreement to broadcast the promotion's Lethwei events.

In 2017, the ILFJ signed a broadcasting deal with MNTV to be aired in Myanmar and livestreaming available in Japan on AbemaTV.

Events

List of champions

World championship history

Openweight Championship 
No Weight limit:  and up

Rules 
ILFJ uses traditional Lethwei rules, with no point system. The only way to win is by knockout or because of an injury or the inability to fight any more. At the end of the match if the two fighters are still standing, the fight is declared a draw.

Rounds 
Each bout can be booked as 4 or 5 rounds fight with 3 minutes per round and a 2-minute break in between rounds. Championship bouts are 5 round with 3 minutes per round.

Weight classes 
ILFJ utilizes the following weight classes:

Notable fighters

  Dave Leduc
  Tun Lwin Moe
  Tun Tun Min
  Too Too
  Saw Nga Man
  Soe Lin Oo
  Shunichi Shimizu
  Julija Stoliarenko
  Vero V.Rujirawong

See also

List of Lethwei fighters
Myanmar Traditional Lethwei Federation
World Lethwei Championship

References

External links

International Lethwei Federation Japan
Lethwei organizations
Sports organizations established in 2016
2016 establishments in Japan
Entertainment companies of Japan
Sports organizations of Japan